Kalareh-ye Zhaleh (also Romanized as Kalāreh-ye Zhāleh; also known as Kalāreh) is a village in Dasht-e Zahab Rural District, in the Central District of Sarpol-e Zahab County, Kermanshah Province, Iran. At the 2006 census, its population was 76, in 12 families.

References 

Populated places in Sarpol-e Zahab County